"Don't Ask Me No Questions" is a song by American Southern rock band Lynyrd Skynyrd, released on their 1974 album Second Helping. It was written by Gary Rossington and Ronnie Van Zant.

Content
The song is notable for its lyrics and simple guitar riff. Lynyrd Skynyrd, depicting themselves as just working-class musicians who liked making music at the time, were anxious in the world of record companies, managers, and agents. The song is a message to the people who did not want anything to do with the band during their early years, but became demanding when the band became successful. It was written by Rossington and Van Zant during a fishing trip. The song failed to reach chart status; however, their later song "Sweet Home Alabama" achieved worldwide recognition.

Personnel
Lynyrd Skynyrd
Ronnie Van Zant - lead vocals
Gary Rossington - guitar
Allen Collins  - guitar
Ed King - bass, slide guitar
Bob Burns - drums and percussion
Billy Powell - keyboards

Other musicians
 Bobby Keys, Trevor Lawrence & Steve Madiao - horns
 Al Kooper - backing vocals and piano

References

1974 songs
Lynyrd Skynyrd songs
Song recordings produced by Al Kooper
Songs written by Ronnie Van Zant
Songs written by Gary Rossington
1974 singles
MCA Records singles